Bronius is a Lithuanian masculine given name. It is a shortened name of Bronislovas.

Notable people with that name include:

Bronius Kutavičius (1932–2021), Lithuanian composer
Bronius Kuzmickas (born 1935), Lithuanian politician and philosopher
Bronius Bružas (born 1941), Lithuanian stained glass artist

Lithuanian masculine given names